The Seventies is a documentary miniseries which premiered on CNN on June 11, 2015. Produced by Tom Hanks and Gary Goetzman' studio Playtone, and serving as a follow-up to The Sixties, the 8-part series chronicled events and popular culture of the United States during the 1970s.

In February 2016, CNN announced that it would premiere a third installment in the franchise, The Eighties, on March 31, 2016.

Episodes

Production
CNN announced the production of the miniseries The Seventies on November 20, 2014, serving as a continuation of their previous documentary miniseries The Sixties.

References

External links

Television series set in the 1970s
2010s American documentary television series
2015 American television series debuts
2015 American television series endings
CNN original programming
Documentary television series about the Cold War
Television series about the history of the United States
Television series by Playtone